The Dutch Safety Board (DSB; , OVV, literally "Investigation Council for Safety") is an organisation based in The Hague, Netherlands. The first DSB Chairman was Pieter van Vollenhoven, who served from 2005 until 2011. He was succeeded by Tjibbe Joustra, who retired in 2019; he was succeeded by former Finance Minister Jeroen Dijsselbloem.

History

The formation of the DSB occurred after the Enschede fireworks disaster and the Volendam café fire. The DSB was formed in 2005 by a merger between the defence and public transportation safety boards. It replaced the Dutch Transport Safety Board.

As of 2012 the DSB actively investigates accidents and incidents related to aviation, construction and services, crisis management and aid provision, defence, human and animal health care, industry and networks, pipelines, rail transport, shipping, as well as water. The DSB has the authorisation to investigate accidents and incidents in any conceivable field.

The National Bureau of Air Accidents Investigation of Ukraine (NBAAI) had requested that the DSB participate in the international investigation of Malaysia Airlines Flight 17; the DSB received formal notice of the accident from the NBAAI on 18 July 2014. The NBAAI delegated the investigation to the DSB because of the large number of Dutch passengers and the fact that the flight originated in Amsterdam.

As a result of the 2017 fipronil egg scandal, the Dutch Safety Board announced on 8 August that an official investigation had been initiated.

Areas of investigations
Operational sectors of investigations include:
 Aviation (commercial, passenger and private aviation)
 Shipping (inland navigation and some segments of recreational navigation)
 Rail transport (railways and increasingly also tram, metro and light rail)
 Road transport (due to the high number of accidents, only thematic investigations)
 Pipelines (pipelines, public utilities included)
 Defence (military aviation, navigation, road transport, underground infrastructure)
 Industry and trade (heavy industry (especially process industry, labour accidents))
 Crisis management and aid provision (performance of aid and control services)
 Healthcare (human and animal)
 Nature and environment (impact of aviation, marine operations, railroad and transportation)

Structure
The board acts as an autonomous organisation. Its code of conduct is established by law.

The organisation consists of a Board and a Bureau. The Board has five permanent members, the Bureau fulfills executive tasks.

See also

 Turkish Airlines Flight 1951
 Sloterdijk train collision
 Netherlands Aviation Safety Board (predecessor agency)
 Aircraft Incident Management Procedure (Netherlands)

References

Sources
This article incorporates text from www.safetyboard.nl, a public domain work of the Dutch government.

External links
 Dutch Safety Board 
 Dutch Safety Board 
 Dutch Safety Board  (Archive)

Government agencies of the Netherlands
Rail accident investigators
Organizations investigating aviation accidents and incidents
Transport safety organizations
Organisations based in The Hague
2005 establishments in the Netherlands
Transport organisations based in the Netherlands